The province of Aceh in Indonesia is divided into regencies and cities, each of which in turn is divided administratively into districts (kecamatan).

The 'kecamatans of Aceh''', with the regency or city into which each falls, are as follows:

 
Aceh